Maksim Zhalmagambetov is a Kazakh football defender. He is currently in the starting XI of the national team.

Early career
Maksim had graduated from his hometown FC Astana and had played in its different feeder clubs, before he eventually got to the first team in 2004.

International career
At the age of 21, Maksim earned his first cap on 17 November 2004 in WC 2006 qualifier against Greece. Maksim would have played all Euro 2008 qualifiers, unless being sent off in a match against Azerbaijan for punching a defender in face, and therefore getting 3 games ban.

Royal Antwerp switch
On 31 January 2008, along with Sergei Ostapenko, Maksim signed a two-year contract with Royal Antwerp F.C. The Belgium team's manager noted that the duo's youth, international experience and physical characteristics were strong arguments to accomplish the deal. However, his European journey was not quite successful and he only started in one game for the reds. Both he and Sergei Ostapenko shortly returned to Astana in the middle of the Kazakhstan Premier League 2008.

Club career stats
Last update: 10 December 2010

Honours
 Kazakhstan Champion: 2006
 Kazakhstan Cup Winner: 2005

References

External links
 Profile at KFF website
 
 

Living people
1983 births
Kazakhstani footballers
Association football defenders
Royal Antwerp F.C. players
Kazakhstan international footballers
Expatriate footballers in Belgium
Sportspeople from Astana
FC Astana players
FC Zhenis Astana players